"Ride a Cock Horse to Banbury Cross" is an English language nursery rhyme connected with the English town Banbury in Oxfordshire. It has a Roud Folk Song Index number of 21143.

Lyrics

Common modern versions include:
Ride a cock-horse to Banbury Cross,
To see a fine lady upon a white horse;
Rings on her fingers and bells on her toes,
And she shall have music wherever she goes.

Alternative version:
Ride a cock-horse to Banbury Cross,
To buy little Johnny a galloping horse;
It trots behind and it ambles before,
And Johnny shall ride till he can ride no more.

Origins
The modern rhyme is the best known of a number of verses beginning with the line "Ride a cock-horse to Banbury Cross", some of which are recorded earlier. These include a verse printed in Tommy Thumb's Pretty Song Book (c. 1744), with the lyrics:

Ride a cock-horse
To Banbury Cross,
To see what Tommy can buy;
A penny white loaf,
A penny white cake,
And a two-penny apple-pie.

A reference in 1725 to 'Now on Cock-horse does he ride' may allude to this or the more famous rhyme, and is the earliest indication we have that they existed. The earliest surviving version of the modern rhyme in Gammer Gurton's Garland or The Nursery Parnassus, printed in London in 1784, differs significantly from modern versions in that the subject is not a fine lady but "an old woman". The version printed in Tommy Thumb's Song Book in America in 1788, which may have been in the original (c. 1744) edition, has the "fine lady", but the next extant version, in The Tom Tit's Song Book (printed in London around 1790), had:

A ring on her finger,
A bonnet of straw,
The strangest old woman
That ever you saw.

Interpretations
The instability of the early recorded lyrics has not prevented considerable speculation about the meaning of the rhyme.

A medieval date had been argued for the rhyme on the grounds that the bells worn on the lady's toes refer to the fashion of wearing bells on the end of shoes in the fifteenth century, but given their absence from so many early versions, this identification is speculative. Similarly, the main Banbury Cross was taken down around 1600, but other crosses were present in the town and, as is often the case, the place may have retained the name, so it is difficult to argue for the antiquity of the rhyme from this fact.

A "cock horse" can mean a high-spirited horse, and the additional horse to assist pulling a cart or carriage up a hill. It can also mean an entire or uncastrated horse. From the mid-sixteenth century it also meant a pretend hobby horse or an adult's knee. There is also an expression "a-cock-horse", meaning "astride". The Cock Hotel, Stony Stratford of 'Cock and Bull' fame might also have been the supplier of the horse for the leg of the journey to Banbury.

Despite not being present or significantly different in many early versions, the fine lady has been associated with Queen Elizabeth I, Lady Godiva, and Celia Fiennes, whose brother was William Fiennes, 3rd Viscount Saye and Sele (c. 1641–1698) of Broughton Castle, Banbury, on the grounds that the line should be 'To see a Fiennes lady'. There is no corroborative evidence to support any of these cases.

In popular culture
 The dystopian novel Brave New World (1932) by Aldous Huxley contains the adapted form "Streptocock-Gee to Banbury T, to see a fine bathroom and W.C.".
 The 1979 specials cover of the Toots and the Maytals song Monkey Man has the following verse
I was on my way to Banbury Cross
Then I see a monkey upon a white horse
With rings on he fingers, bells on him toes
Sing a little song, wherever he be
'Cause he's a monkey, 'cause he's a monkey
'Cause he's a weedy-weedy-tweedy-weedy monkey man
 Morrissey Rides A Cockhorse is the title track of the Warlock Pinchers 1989 EP, Morrissey Rides A Cockhorse.
 Utah donut shop Banbury Cross Donuts was named after this nursery rhyme.

References

Songs about horses
Banbury
English nursery rhymes
English folk songs
English children's songs
Traditional children's songs
History of Oxfordshire
Songwriter unknown
Year of song unknown